Ranghulu District is a district of Daqing, Heilongjiang province, China.

Schools in the district include Daqing No.1 Middle School.

Administrative divisions 
Ranghulu District is divided into 6 subdistricts and 1 township. 
6 subdistricts
 Longgang, Yinlang, Fendou, Qingxin, Xibin, Chengfeng
1 town
 Lamadian

See also

References

External links
  Government site - 

Administrative subdivisions of Heilongjiang
Daqing